Nectopsyche candida is a species of long-horned caddisfly in the family Leptoceridae. It is found in North America.

References

Trichoptera
Articles created by Qbugbot
Insects described in 1861